The Cerna is a small right tributary of the Danube in Romania. It flows into Lake Traian, which is connected with the Danube, in the village Traian.

References

Rivers of Romania
Rivers of Tulcea County